James Henry Ambrose Griffiths (July 16, 1903—February 24, 1964) was an American prelate of the Roman Catholic Church. He served as an auxiliary bishop of the Archdiocese of New York from 1950 to 1964.

Biography

Early life and education
James Griffiths was born in Brooklyn, New York, to James Henry and Helen Agatha (née O'Neil) Griffiths. He received his early education at St. Augustine's Academy from 1915 to 1919. He then attended St. John's University in Brooklyn, where he earned a Bachelor of Arts degree in 1923. He studied for the priesthood at the Almo Collegio Capranica and the Pontifical Gregorian University, both in Rome. He received a doctorate in theology from the Gregorian in 1927.

Ordination and ministry
Griffiths was ordained a priest in Rome on March 12, 1927. Following his return to New York, he was assigned as a curate at St. Joseph's Church in Babylon, where he remained for one year. He then served at Our Lady of Mercy Church in Queens (1928–29) and at St. Augustine's Church in Park Slope (1929–31). In addition to his pastoral duties, he was an instructor of New Testament scripture at the Dominican Normal School in Amityville from 1927 to 1929.

Griffiths was named secretary (1929) and later auditor (1931) of the diocesan tribunal. From 1935 to 1943, he was vice-chancellor of the Diocese of Brooklyn. He also served as diocesan censor of books. He was named a papal chamberlain in 1938, and raised to the rank of domestic prelate in 1944. One of the co-founders of the Canon Law Society of America, he served as its president from 1941 to 1942.

Following the United States' entry into World War II in 1941, Griffiths was charged with the supervision of chaplains from the Diocese of Brooklyn. He also directed the work of the Vatican Information Service in the diocese, transmitting messages monthly to and from persons in enemy-occupied countries. In November 1943, he was named chancellor of the Military Ordinariate, serving Catholics in the U.S. armed forces throughout the world.

Auxiliary Bishop of New York
On October 15, 1949, Griffiths was appointed auxiliary bishop of the Archdiocese of New York and titular bishop of Gaza by Pope Pius XII. He received his episcopal consecration on January 18, 1950, from Cardinal Francis Spellman, with Bishops Thomas Edmund Molloy and William Richard Arnold serving as co-consecrators, at St. Patrick's Cathedral. As an auxiliary bishop, he continued to serve as chancellor of the Military Ordinariate, a post which he held until 1955. In March 1952, Cardinal Spellman appointed Griffiths to the board of archdiocesan consultors. The following year, he was named to the Committee on Moral and Spiritual Resources of the International Information Administration, a federal agency that handled overseas information and Voice of America.

In September 1955, Griffiths became pastor of St. Monica's Church in New York City. He represented the Holy See at the United Nations and was its permanent observer at the Economic and Social Council. He was also a member of the New York City Commission on the United Nations and assistant bishop for United Nations Affairs on the administrative board of the National Catholic Welfare Council. During the Second Vatican Council, he was named as one of the five members of the United States Bishops' Commission on the Liturgical Apostolate to study the introduction of English in parts of the Mass and other sacraments.

Griffiths died from a heart attack at the rectory of St. Monica's Church, at age 60.

See also

 Catholic Church hierarchy
 Catholic Church in the United States
 Historical list of the Catholic bishops of the United States
 Insignia of Chaplain Schools in the US Military
 List of Catholic bishops of the United States
 List of Catholic bishops of the United States: military service
 Lists of patriarchs, archbishops, and bishops
 Military chaplain
 Religious symbolism in the United States military
 United States military chaplains

References

External links
 Archdiocese for the Military Services, USA, official website
 Archdiocese for the Military Services of the United States. GCatholic.org. Retrieved 2010-08-20.
 Roman Catholic Archdiocese of New York Official Website

1903 births
1964 deaths
People from Brooklyn
St. John's University (New York City) alumni
Participants in the Second Vatican Council
American military chaplains
World War II chaplains
Chaplains
20th-century Roman Catholic bishops in the United States
Roman Catholic bishops in New York (state)
People of the Roman Catholic Archdiocese of New York